Trinidad station may refer to:

Trinidad station (Colorado), a railroad station in Trinidad, Colorado, USA
Trinidad metro station, a metro station in Santiago, Chile

See also
Trindade station, a metro station in Porto, Portugal
Trinidad (disambiguation)